The Minister for the Environment and Natural Resources is the head of the Ministry for the Environment and Natural Resources. The current Minister for the Environment and Natural Resources is Guðlaugur Þór Þórðarson.

List of ministers

Ministers for the Environment (23 February 1990 – 1 September 2012)

Ministers for the Environment and Natural Resources (1 September 2012 – present)

References

External links
Official website 
Official website 

 Environment